Freedom Transit (formerly 'Washington City Transit') is the designation for the public transit agency providing bus services in the urbanized portion of central and northern Washington County, Pennsylvania. Local bus routes are designed to serve Washington, Pennsylvania, an edge city and a key location of both business parks and shopping amenities. The "Metro" bus route provides access from the Washington County suburbs to Downtown Pittsburgh. The Metro bus route makes stops in Washington, Houston and Canonsburg, serving central and northern Washington County, traveling ten times per weekday in each direction to Downtown Pittsburgh.  The Metro service also stops at designated park and ride locations.  More limited bus service is offered on Saturdays, with service to the South Hills "T" Transit Center.

In July 2015, Washington City Transit merged into the Washington County Transportation Authority.  The combined agency now operates bus service using the name Freedom Transit.

Routes
Local B Route: Trinity Point-Strabane Square-Downtown Washington-Washington Crown Center Mall: Washington, South Strabane Township 
Local A Route Hospital-Jefferson Ave-Downtown Washington-Washington Park: Washington, North Franklin Township
County Line: McDonald Borough, Muse, Canonsburg, Houston Borough, The Meadows Racetrack and Casino, Tanger Outlets, Arden (Fairgrounds, PA Trolley Museum), Downtown Washington
Pittsburgh Metro Commuter: Washington, South Strabane, Meadowlands, Houston Borough, Canonsburg, Southpointe (Cecil Township) to Downtown Pittsburgh

Park & Ride Lots
Jessop Place (Canton Township)- 69 spaces (Commuter, Commuter Express) 
Southpointe (Cecil Township)- 129 spaces (Commuter Express)
Trinity Point (South Strabane)- 224 spaces (Commuter)

References

External links
 Website: www.freedom-transit.org Twitter: @WashPATransit

Bus transportation in Pennsylvania
Transportation in Washington County, Pennsylvania